Acrobat Ranch is an American children's television series that aired on ABC on Saturday morning from August 19, 1950, to May 12, 1951. The program is notable for being one of ABC's first Saturday morning children's shows. It was also "ABC's entry into the morning TV field".

Summary
The program consisted of circus acts, audience participation games, and stunts. Acrobat Ranch had a circus theme. Placed against a Western backdrop, acrobats Tumbling Tim and Flying Flo lent an air of spectacle to Acrobat Ranch. In one segment, host Uncle Jim presided over a game in which children from the studio audience competed for merchandise prizes.

Cast
The cast included:
Valerie Alberts as Flying Flo
Billy Alberts as Tumbling Tim
Jack Stillwell as Uncle Jack

Production 
Acrobat Ranch was broadcast live and originated from WENR in Chicago. Norm Heyne was the director. General Shoe Corporation sponsored the program.

References

1950s American children's television series
1950 American television series debuts
1951 American television series endings
American Broadcasting Company original programming
Circus television shows
American live television series